Bassem Boulaâbi (born 11 January 1984 in Tunis) is a Tunisian footballer who currently plays for Stade Tunisien.

Club career
On 15 January 2015, Boulaâbi had his contract with CS Sfaxien terminated by mutual consent. On 18 January, he moved abroad for the first time in his career, joining Chinese Super League side Hangzhou Greentown. He was sent to reserved squad in July 2015 after team manager Philippe Troussier was sacked by the club.

International career
On 27 May 2012, Boulaâbi made his debut for Tunisia national football team in a 5–1 victory against Rwanda.

Honours
CS Sfaxien
 CAF Confederation Cup: 2013
 Tunisian Ligue Professionnelle 1: 2012–13

References

External links
 
 

1984 births
People from Tunis
Living people
Association football defenders
Tunisian footballers
Tunisia international footballers
Tunisian expatriate footballers
Stade Tunisien players
Étoile Sportive du Sahel players
AS Kasserine players
CS Sfaxien players
Zhejiang Professional F.C. players
CS Hammam-Lif players
AS Marsa players
Tunisian Ligue Professionnelle 1 players
Chinese Super League players
Expatriate footballers in China
Tunisian expatriate sportspeople in China